Lajos Wick (7 August 1892 – 21 January 1959) was a Hungarian rower. He competed at the 1924 Summer Olympics in Paris with the men's coxed four where they were eliminated in the round one repechage. During the 1910s and 1920s, Wick won twelve national titles.

References

External links
 

1892 births
1959 deaths
Hungarian male rowers
Olympic rowers of Hungary
Rowers at the 1924 Summer Olympics
European Rowing Championships medalists